Harzandiq (also Romanized as Harzandīq; also known as Arzāni, Arzany, and Harzanaq) is a village in Mavazekhan-e Shomali Rural District, Khvajeh District, Heris County, East Azerbaijan Province, Iran. At the 2006 census, its population was 109, in 25 families.

References 

Populated places in Heris County